Radio OP is the only local and public radio station in Burgenland, Austria.  Radio is aired at 98.8 MHz from one of the Telekom Austria’s tower, near Oberpullendorf.  It is available on the major part of the Oberpullendorf district in Austria as well as in Bük, Kópháza, Nagycenk, Harka, Ólmod and some parts of Sopron in Hungary.

Aired
Main aim of the station is the work as a school radio in the secondary grammar school in Oberpullendorf. The second most important aim is to give an available program for the Burgenland's minorities, such as for the Hungarians and Croats in Burgenland.

Community radio stations in Austria
Burgenland
Radio stations established in 2009
2009 establishments in Austria